James Neilson Fitzpatrick (21 July 1886 – 9 September 1960) was an Australian rules footballer who played with Melbourne and Richmond in the Victorian Football League (VFL).

Notes

External links 

 

1886 births
1960 deaths
Australian rules footballers from Victoria (Australia)
Australian Rules footballers: place kick exponents
Melbourne Football Club players
Richmond Football Club players